Reading Area Community College (RACC) is a public community college in Reading, Pennsylvania.  The college was founded in 1971 and serves the greater Reading area and Berks County, Pennsylvania. The institution is an Hispanic-serving institution ('HSI') as defined by federal law (the Higher Education Opportunity Act, Title V, 2008).

References

External links

Two-year colleges in the United States
Community colleges in Pennsylvania
Educational institutions established in 1971
Universities and colleges in Berks County, Pennsylvania
Buildings and structures in Reading, Pennsylvania
1971 establishments in Pennsylvania